Cyathea glaziovii is a species of tree fern. Very little is known about this plant and its taxonomic status is uncertain.

References
The International Plant Names Index: Cyathea glaziovii

glaziovii